English singer-songwriter Frank Turner has released nine solo studio albums, seven live albums, thirteen extended plays, six compilation albums, three video albums and thirty-six singles, among other releases.

Albums

Studio albums

Compilation albums

Live albums

Extended plays

Singles

Featured appearances

DVDs

Split releases

Music videos

References

Discographies of British artists
Folk music discographies
Punk rock discographies